= Tabuleiro na Baiana =

The Tabuleiro da Baiana was a public transportation terminal on Avenida Almirante Barroso, in Rio de Janeiro, Brazil. The terminal was inaugurated in 1930 as part of the plan of reurbanization of the Largo da Lapa implemented under the management of Henrique Dodsworth, the federal comptroller of the City of Rio de Janeiro from 1937 to 1945.

The enormous rectangular structure made of reinforced concrete was popularly nicknamed the Tabuleiro da Baiana (tray of the Bahian) because of its tabular shape that was reminiscent of the small tables used by Bahians to sell their delicacies. Located on a stretch between Avenida Treze de Maio and Rua Senador Dantas, the roof served as the final point for the tram lines coming from the South Zone of the city. In the mid-1960s, with the decay of rail service, it came to be used as a bus terminal. The Tabuleiro was demolished during the new urbanization implemented in the center of the city in the 1970s.
